Specklinia barbosana is a species of orchid plant native to Brazil.

References 

barbosana
Flora of Brazil
Plants described in 1906
Taxa named by Émile Auguste Joseph De Wildeman